The 2018–19 Baylor Lady Bears basketball team represented Baylor University in the 2018–19 NCAA Division I women's basketball season. Returning as head coach was Hall of Famer Kim Mulkey for her 19th season. The team played its home games at the Ferrell Center in Waco, Texas and were members of the Big 12 Conference. They finished the season ranked #1 in the nation, with a record of 37–1, 18–0 in Big 12 to win the Big 12 regular season title. They also won the Big 12 women's tournament and earned an automatic bid to the NCAA women's tournament where they advanced to defeat Notre Dame in the championship game for the third title in team history.

Previous season
The Lady Bears finished the season 33–2, 18–0 in Big 12 to win the Big 12 regular season title. They also won the Big 12 women's tournament and earned an automatic bid to the NCAA women's tournament where they defeated Grambling State and Michigan in the first and second rounds before getting upset by Oregon State in the sweet sixteen.

Roster

Rankings

^Coaches' Poll did not release a second poll at the same time as the AP.

Schedule and results

|-
!colspan=6 style=| Exhibition

|-
!colspan=9 style=| Non-conference regular season

|-
!colspan=9 style=| Big 12 regular season

|-
!colspan=9 style=| Big 12 women's tournament

|-
!colspan=9 style=| NCAA women's tournament

References

Baylor Bears women's basketball seasons
Baylor
Baylor
NCAA Division I women's basketball tournament championship seasons
NCAA Division I women's basketball tournament Final Four seasons